The 2003–04 season was second year of the Elite One Championship, the top-level rugby league French Championship.

The league was previously called the National League 1 from 1958-2002. In 2002, the top-level French Rugby League Championship was split into two divisions, Elite One and Elite Two. For the 2003–04 season, 10 clubs competed in the Elite One Championship, and no clubs were relegated to, nor promoted from, Elite Two at season's endthe same 10 teams would compete again in the Elite One 2004–05 season.

Table 

Note: (C) = champions, (R) = relegated

Grand Final

See also 
 Rugby league in France
 French Rugby League Championship
 Elite One Championship II

References

External links
 Rankings on itsrugby.fr

Rugby league competitions in France
2004 in French rugby league
2003 in French rugby league